is a Japanese former football player.

Playing career
Kurihara was born in Chiba Prefecture on July 29, 1977. He joined his local club JEF United Ichihara from youth team in 1996. He played many matches as left side back and left side midfielder. The club also won the 2nd place 1998 J.League Cup. He retired end of 1999 season.

Club statistics

References

External links

1977 births
Living people
Association football people from Chiba Prefecture
Japanese footballers
J1 League players
JEF United Chiba players
Association football defenders